The dotted brown snake (Sordellina punctata)  is a genus of the Colubridae family of snakes. It is monotypic in the genus Sordellina. It is endemic to Brazil.

References

Colubrids
Snake genera
Taxa named by Wilhelm Peters